Jiménez (officially, José Mariano Jiménez)  is a city and seat of the municipality of Jiménez, in the northern Mexican state of Chihuahua. As of 2010, the city had a population of 34,281, up from 33,567 as of 2005.

It was founded on January 4, 1753, under the name of Real Presidio de Santa Maria de las Caldas del Valle de Huejoquilla.
The current name (since 1826) honors Independence War hero José Mariano Jiménez. It was given city status in 1898.

References

Populated places in Chihuahua (state)
Populated places established in 1753
1753 establishments in New Spain